Frankfort High School is the name of several high schools in the United States:

Frankfort High School (Michigan) – Frankfort, Michigan
Frankfort High School (Indiana) – Frankfort, Indiana
Frankfort High School (Kansas) – Frankfort, Kansas
Frankfort High School (Kentucky) – Frankfort, Kentucky
Frankfort High School (West Virginia) – Short Gap, West Virginia

See also:
Frankford High School